Simone Bertoletti (born 25 August 1974) is a former Italian cyclist.

Career
Bertoletti began his professional career in 1996 with the Gewiss–Playbus team. The following season, he received his first victory, stage 5 of the Tour de Pologne.

In 2003, Bertoletti celebrated his biggest success during the Tour de Romandie, when he won the first stage of the race. He escaped the peloton for 160 kilometers in the rain, winning the stage by over a minute. This success allowed him to wear the yellow jersey for two days.

He participated in 11 total Grand Tours: five consecutive editions of the Giro d'Italia and six consecutive editions of the Vuelta a España, from 1999 to 2004.

Major results

1997
 1st Stage 5 Tour de Pologne
2001
 5th GP du canton d'Argovie
2003
 1st Stage 1 Tour de Romandie
 1st Stage 2 Settimana Internazionale di Coppi e Bartali (TTT)
 8th Overall Volta ao Algarve

Grand Tour general classification results timeline

References

1974 births
Living people
Italian male cyclists
Sportspeople from Mantua
Cyclists from the Province of Mantua